Zaina Bouzerrade (born 29 July 2002) is a footballer who plays as a right-back for Eredivisie club PEC Zwolle. Born in the Netherlands, she represents Morocco at international level.

Club career
Bouzerrade is a VVIJ IJsselstein product. She has played for Ajax in the Netherlands.

International career
Bouzerrade made her senior debut for Morocco on 10 June 2021 in a 3–0 friendly home win over Mali.

See also
List of Morocco women's international footballers

References

External links 

2002 births
Living people
Citizens of Morocco through descent
Moroccan women's footballers
Women's association football fullbacks
Morocco women's international footballers
People from IJsselstein
Footballers from Utrecht (province)
Dutch women's footballers
AFC Ajax (women) players
Dutch sportspeople of Moroccan descent